Donald C. Thompson (November 9, 1930 – August 21, 2022), also known as Deese Thompson, was a United States Coast Guard vice admiral. He served as Commander of the Coast Guard Atlantic Area and US Maritime Defense Zone Atlantic.

References

1930 births
2022 deaths
Military personnel from New York City
People from Brooklyn
United States Coast Guard admirals